Mayuko Hitotsuyanagi, better known by her stage name Cuushe, is a Japanese singer-songwriter, multi-instrumentalist, and record producer from Kyoto. She is based in Tokyo. She is one half of the duo Neon Cloud along with Geskia. Her music has been released on Flau and Cascine.

Biography
Growing up in Kyoto, Cuushe spent time in Osaka before moving to Tokyo. She also spent extended periods of time in London and Berlin. She started making music in 2008.

Her debut studio album, Red Rocket Telepathy, was released in 2009. In 2012, she released an EP, Girl You Know That I Am Here but the Dream. Her second studio album, Butterfly Case, was released in 2013. Patrick St. Michel of Pitchfork called it "a captivating collection of dream pop." In 2015, she released an EP, Night Lines. "We Can't Stop", a song from the EP, was used in the American dark comedy television series Search Party.

In 2017, she became a victim of stalking and online sexual harassment. A fellow musician broke into her house and stole her unreleased recordings, musical equipment, and personal items such as clothes and photographs.

Style and influences
In a 2012 interview with Dazed, Cuushe cited "musician friends, movies, [and] sadness" as her top 3 musical inspirations.

Colin Joyce of Pitchfork wrote, "The wispy-voiced Tokyo songwriter is nominally a dream-pop act, indulgent in the stirring static and hushed whispers that have become requisite for the genre."

Discography

Studio albums
 Red Rocket Telepathy (2009)
 Butterfly Case (2013)
 Waken (2020)

EPs
 Knit (2011) 
 Girl You Know That I Am Here but the Dream (2012)
 Scar (2014) 
 Night Lines (2015)

Singles
 "Light" (2020)

Guest appearances
 Iglooghost - "Gold Coat" from Chinese Nü Yr (2015)
 Iglooghost - "Infinite Mint" from Neō Wax Bloom (2017)
 Anomie Belle - "Unwind (Cuushe Remix)" from Flux Remixed (2018)

References

External links
 
 

Year of birth missing (living people)
Living people
Japanese singer-songwriters
Japanese multi-instrumentalists
Japanese record producers
Musicians from Kyoto
Cascine artists